Communist Party of Ecuador (in Spanish: Partido Comunista del Ecuador) is a communist party in Ecuador. It was formed in 1925 as the Socialist Party. The party publishes El Pueblo,  the general secretary is Winston Alarcón and the youth wing of the PCE is the Communist Youth of Ecuador.

History 
After its foundation PCE gradually gained in importance; in 1944 the PCE won fifteen out of eighty-five seats in the National Assembly and had one of its members appointed minister of education. The first female MP of the country, Nela Martínez, belonged to the party. In 1946 the government outlawed the PCE and jailed many of its members. The PCE was legalized during the 1948-52 term of President Galo Plaza, but was banned again when the military junta held power in 1963-1966.

In 1964 PCE suffered a major split. The pro-China minority constituted the Marxist-Leninist Communist Party of Ecuador (PCMLE) which went on to side with Albania during the Sino-Albanian split and now maintains a hoxhaist line.

In the mid-1960s the U.S. State Department estimated the party membership to be approximately 2500.

Later PCE was legalized, although it had only an estimated 5000 members in 1988. The PCE participated in congressional and presidential elections as part of the coalition of the Broad Left Front, which gained thirteen seats in Congress in 1986.

The main strength of PCE is its trade union work. PCE plays a leading role in the Confederation of Ecuadorian Workers. The party supported the government of the former presidente Rafael Correa.

References 

1925 establishments in Ecuador
Ecuador
Communist parties in Ecuador
Far-left politics in Ecuador
Political parties established in 1925
International Meeting of Communist and Workers Parties